XHJK-TDT, virtual channel 1 (UHF digital channel 28), is a television station in Tijuana, Baja California, Mexico. The station is owned by TV Azteca. XHJK carries TV Azteca's Azteca Uno, with a 2-hour delay except for live television.

XHJK received its initial concession in July 1981.

Digital television

Digital subchannels 
The station's digital channel is multiplexed:

XHJK was the only city where Proyecto 40 (now ADN 40) was modified to include local programming. Ultimately, local programming in each area was moved to a más+.

Analog to digital conversion 
Due to the Mexican analog to digital conversion mandate, XHJK-TV shut down its analog signal on May 28, 2013, and again on July 18, 2013.

In 2016, XHJK moved from virtual channel 27 to virtual channel 1 as part of the nationwide move of the Azteca Trece network to that virtual channel. It was able to do so because channel 1 has generally not been issued to American stations since 1948. The network later renamed on January 1, 2018.

Repeaters
XHJK has five repeaters, four of them in Tijuana:

|-

|-

|-

|-

|}

See also
 XHTIT-TDT
 XHAS-TDT

References 

Azteca Uno transmitters
Mass media in Tecate
HJK-TDT